Jon Kraft is an American business executive best known as a co-founder of Pandora Media, Inc. and its  former CEO. He also co-founded Thrively, LiftOff, Big Stage Entertainment and Stanford Technology Group and previously worked for a number of technology companies including Oracle Corporation, CoreObjects Software, Ubermedia and Auryn, Inc. He currently serves as the Chairman of Thrively, managing partner of LiftOff LLC and the Chief Executive Officer of MuMo, Inc.

Early life and education 
Kraft was born in Brooklyn and raised in Plainview, New York. He holds a Bachelor of Arts degree from Stanford University. From 1989 to 1992, he worked for Oracle Corporation as a Senior Technical Analyst.

Career

Stanford Technology Group 
In 1993, Kraft started his first company, Stanford Technology Group, which developed analytical software and consulted to Fortune 500 companies on the design and implementation of large database management systems. He served as its Vice President until it was acquired by Informix Corporation in 1995. At Informix, Kraft served as the Director of Business Development and Product Marketing for two years.

Pandora Media 

In 1999 Jon Kraft along with Will Glaser and Tim Westergren founded Pandora Media as Savage Beast Technologies in Oakland, California with the idea of The Music Genome Project, a mathematical algorithm to organize music. He served as its founding Chief Executive Officer from 2000 to 2002. He, along with the other developers, patented the Music Genome Project: software that uses a mathematical algorithm that attempts to predict a person's musical taste based on a small musical sampling, and is covered by United States Patent No. 7,003,515.

Big Stage Entertainment, Thrively and other works 
In 2002, Kraft joined at CoreObjects Software and served as the Senior Vice President, Sales and Marketing until 2005. He co-founded Big Stage Entertainment along with Jonathan Strietzel and Jon Snoddy and served as its Chief Operating Officer from 2006 and 2010. The company was named by Forbes in 2009 as one of “America’s 20 Most Promising Companies.”  From 2010 to 2012, Kraft served as Chief Operating Officer of Ubermedia, an independent developer of social mobile applications and was a member of the founding team.

He previously served as a member of advisory board at Minerals Corporation Limited since April 2016.

References 

Living people
Year of birth missing (living people)
People from Los Angeles
Stanford University alumni
Businesspeople in software
American corporate directors
American technology chief executives
American technology company founders
Businesspeople in information technology
American computer businesspeople
Businesspeople from Los Angeles